Orchid Chemicals & Pharmaceuticals Limited is an Indian pharmaceutical company based in Chennai, founded on 1 July 1992, by  Kailasam Raghavendra Rao, an alumnus of IIM Ahmedabad (PGP '79) . As of 2007, it was among the top fortune 500 Indian companies by market capitalization.

History
In 1992, Orchid obtained a certificate for commencement of business and became a public company the following year. It began producing commercially in 1995 and received the Good manufacturing practice certification. 

In 1999, it became the largest producer of oral and sterile cephalosporin and was ranked among the top five producers of cephalosporin APIs. That same year, the formulation division began operations. The early 2000s, the company established offices in the United States and Russia, then signed an agreement to produce oral cephalosporin for the U.S. market in the mid-2000s.

The company had a joint venture with Bexel allowing it to complete its phase 1(a), (b) and phase 2(a) clinical trials for the anti-diabetic molecule BLX-1002 and get patent clearance in the U.S.. After obtaining the patent, the company made an agreement with pharmaceutical companies in Canada to help produce oral drugs and veterinarian injectables before expanding its market into Europe.  

In 2008 and 2009, the company received approval to enter the Canadian and Australian markets and established a wholly owned subsidiary in Japan.

Company details 
Orchid's main products are active pharmaceutical ingredients, including cephalosporins (oral and injectable), carbapenems and penicillin. The other main production is domestic formulations for cardio, anti-diabetic, neuropsychiatry, and critical care applications. It has three research campuses, three formulations manufacturing sites, and two API manufacturing sites in India.  It also has one API manufacturing site in China.  Orchid has a workforce of over 4,000 employees, with 700 working at Aurangabad plant in Maharashtra.

Financials 

Orchid Pharma securities are traded at NSE, BSE, MSE, and Singapore Stock Exchange. As per a March 2011 report, total asset value is approximately 3155 crores INR, including fixed assets of 2206 crores INR. The annual revenue is 1594.68 crores INR with a net profit approximately 159.5 crores INR. Total number of public shares is 48939460, with EPS 22.64. As of June 2011, Market Capital value stands at 1991.40 crores INR.

As per All India Bank Employees Association and other reports, Orchid Chemicals & Pharmaceuticals has defaulted loans with state owned banks for more than Rs. 15 billion.

References

External links 
Official Website of Orchid Chemicals & Pharmaceuticals Limited

Pharmaceutical companies of India
Pharmaceutical companies established in 1992
Companies based in Chennai
Indian companies established in 1992
1992 establishments in Tamil Nadu